The Arawale National Reserve is a designated conservation area managed by the Garissa County in assistance with the Kenya Wildlife Service. It lies in North Eastern Province of Kenya, 77 km south of the town of Garissa. To the west, it is bordered by the Tana River and, to the east, by the Garissa-Lamu road. In 1974, the reserve was gazetted as the only in-situ conservation site for the critically endangered Hirola population endemic to north-eastern Kenya and south-west Somalia.

Wildlife
The reserve is a critical refuge for a range of wildlife species including four globally threatened species: hirola, Grevy's zebra, East African wild dog and East African cheetah. A study commissioned by Terra Nuova in 2006 also showed signs of presence of the African bush elephant.

Since 2005, the protected area is considered a Lion Conservation Unit together with Lag Badana National Park.

References

 Andaje, S. A. (2002) Factors limiting the Abundance and Distribution of Hirola in Tsavo and Tana River Districts. Kenya Wildlife Service: Biodiversity Conservation Unit.
 Antipa, R. S, Ali, M. H. and Hussein, A. A. (2007) Assessment of the Potential of Eco/Cultural Tourism as Viable Enterprises in Southern Garissa, Ijara and Lamu Districts: A Community Conservation and Enterprise Support Initiative. National Environmental Management Authority of Kenya.
 Muchai, M. et al. (2007) The Distribution, Abundance and Habitat Use of the Hunter's Hartebeest (Hirola); Beatragus hunteri; Sclater, 1889 in Ishaqibini Community Wildlife Conservancy and Arawale National Reserve, Kenya. National Museums of Kenya.

External links
 National Environmental Management Authority of Kenya
 Kenya Wildlife Service
 National Museums of Kenya
 EDGE of Existence – Top 100 Mammals
 IUCN Red List
 African Conservation Foundation
 Terra Nuova webpage (Italian)

Protected areas of Kenya
Protected areas established in 1974
Northern Zanzibar–Inhambane coastal forest mosaic